Kang Hyun-Wook (born November 4, 1985) is a South Korean footballer who since 2013 has played for Changwon City in the Korea National League.

He was formerly attached to Daejeon Citizen in the K-League.

References

1985 births
Living people
South Korean footballers
Korea National League players
K League 1 players
K3 League players
Chungju Hummel FC players
Daejeon Hana Citizen FC players
Gyeongju Citizen FC players
Changwon City FC players
Association football midfielders